Bryton McClure (born August 17, 1986), also credited as Bryton James and mononymously as Bryton, is an American musical theatre, film and television actor. As a child actor, he played Richie Crawford on the ABC/CBS sitcom Family Matters. He currently plays Devon Hamilton on the CBS soap opera The Young and the Restless in which he won two Daytime Emmy Awards.

Early life 
James was born in Lakewood, California, to Eric McClure (1961–2016) and Bette McClure, and raised in Fullerton, California. Bryton was exposed to music very early through his father, who was a musician, songwriter, and music producer.

Career 
James started in show business when he was two years old. He appeared in commercials and magazine ads, including one with singer Michael Jackson. At the age of four, he began portraying Richie Crawford on the sitcom Family Matters, where he appeared from 1990 to 1997 in over 200 episodes. He has portrayed Devon Hamilton on the CBS soap opera The Young and the Restless since June 2004. He won the 2007 Daytime Emmy Award for Outstanding Younger Actor in a Drama Series, and earned nominations for the same award in 2006 and 2008.  After being nominated for the NAACP Image Award for Outstanding Actor in a Daytime Drama Series from 2005 through 2008, James won the award in 2009.

James was a guest star on the drama The Vampire Diaries during its second season as warlock Luka Martin. He voices Jason James/Z-Strap on Nicktoons animated series Zevo-3 and Virgil Hawkins/Static in the Cartoon Network series Young Justice: Invasion. He has provided the voice of Mark Surge in Hero Factory. His credits also include voice acting work as Freddie on the animated series The Kids From Room 402, Mowgli on The Jungle Book CD-ROM, and Zare Leonis on Star Wars Rebels. Additionally, James was a recording artist and performed on Disney Channel and other U.S. and international networks.

In July 2018, it was announced that James had joined the cast of Nickelodeon's animated series, Glitch Techs. In 2020, he won the Daytime Emmy Award for Best Supporting Actor in a drama series for The Young and The Restless.

Personal life 
James married Ashley Leisinger on March 16, 2011. The ceremony was officiated by his The Young and the Restless co-star Christian LeBlanc. In June 2014, James confirmed that he and Leisinger have since divorced but are still close friends. He began dating his co-star Brytni Sarpy in May 2019.

James is best friends with his The Young and the Restless co-star Christel Khalil. Saying about their friendship: "Christel and I have practically grown up together and have experienced some of the same things in our adult lives. We've always had each other's backs. I'm an only child and Christel is the closest thing I have to a sibling." James is the godfather to Khalil's son, Michael Caden. He is also godfather to his other The Young and the Restless co-star, Daniel Goddard's eldest son, Ford.

James is a spokesperson for many charitable organizations and founded RADDKids (Recording Artists, Actors and Athletes Against Drunk Driving) in 1996.

Filmography

Video games

AudioBooks

Awards and nominations

References

External links 

1986 births
Living people
American male child actors
African-American male actors
American male pop singers
American male television actors
American male soap opera actors
Daytime Emmy Award winners
Daytime Emmy Award for Outstanding Supporting Actor in a Drama Series winners
Daytime Emmy Award for Outstanding Younger Actor in a Drama Series winners
People from Lakewood, California

21st-century African-American male singers